The Dallas Weekly is a newspaper headquartered in Dallas, Texas. It is one of the major Dallas-Fort Worth black newspapers. It was first published in 1954.

From 1954 to 1985 the publisher was founder Tony Davis, from 1985 to 2018 James Washington was publisher. Patrick Washington, James Washington's son, is now CEO/Co-Publisher.

See also
 History of African Americans in Dallas-Fort Worth

References

External links
 Dallas Weekly

Newspapers published in the Dallas–Fort Worth metroplex
Publications established in 1954
African-American newspapers
Weekly newspapers published in Texas